Jonas Lars Björkman (born 23 March 1972) is a Swedish former professional tennis player. He is a former world No. 1 in doubles, and also a former world No. 4 in singles. Björkman retired from professional tennis after competing at the 2008 Tennis Masters Cup doubles championships. As of 2019, he is ranked in the top 40 on the all-time ATP prize money list with over $14.5 million.

Björkman has had long-term successful doubles partnerships with Jan Apell, Jacco Eltingh, Nicklas Kulti, Max Mirnyi, Pat Rafter, Kevin Ullyett, and Todd Woodbridge. He has won the career Grand Slam in men's doubles, holding a total of nine major championships.

In March 2015, he joined Andy Murray's coaching team. He has also coached the Swedish men's padel team.

Biography
The son of tennis coach and mailman Lars Björkman, Jonas began playing tennis at the age of six. At 18, he won the Swedish Junior Championship and was among the top-5 Swede junior players. He married Petra on 2 December 2000 in Stockholm, and they have a son, Max (born 15 January 2003).

He plays right-handed and has a particularly good record against left-handed players. He claims it's because his father plays left-handed.

Career
He turned professional in 1991. In 1993, he won three Challenger singles titles. In 1994, he won seven titles in doubles including the 1994 ATP Tour World Championships in Jakarta. In 1995, he reached his first career ATP singles final in Hong Kong. In 1997, he became the ninth ever Swedish tennis player to finish in ATP top 10 at No. 4. He advanced to his first Grand Slam semifinal at the US Open, defeating Francisco Clavet, Todd Martin, Gustavo Kuerten, Scott Draper and Petr Korda before losing to Greg Rusedski. At the 1998 Australian Open, he won his first career doubles Grand Slam title. 2000 saw him finishing in the singles top 50 for the fifth time in seven years.

In his ATP career, he won six singles titles and 54 titles in doubles, including nine Grand Slam titles in doubles.

He made his Davis Cup debut in 1994 and was a regular for Sweden throughout his career. He compiled a 21–14 record in doubles and a 14–9 record in live singles rubbers. He was a member of Sweden's Davis Cup championship teams in 1994, 1997, and 1998.

In 2002, Björkman won the Nottingham Open by defeating Wayne Arthurs in the final, however, at Wimbledon, he found himself drawn against top seed Lleyton Hewitt in the first round. Björkman was defeated in straight sets, as Hewitt went on to win the tournament.

In the 2006 Wimbledon, he unexpectedly made it into the singles semifinals at the age of 34, making him the oldest player to get there since Jimmy Connors in 1987. He had only made it into the singles quarterfinals once in 2003. He was unseeded, but defeated 14th-seeded Radek Štěpánek in a match which included saving a match point. He had previously ousted his doubles partner Max Mirnyi and another Swede, Thomas Johansson, and Lukáš Dlouhý and Daniele Bracciali to make the quarterfinals. In the semifinal he found world No. 1 and defending champion Roger Federer too good and was overpowered in straight sets, 6–2, 6–0, 6–2.
When John McEnroe announced his official return to the ATP Pro Tour in 2006, he teamed up with Björkman to win the doubles title at the SAP Open in San Jose.

During Wimbledon in 2008, he announced that he would be playing in his final Wimbledon as he was planning on retiring at the end of the season. Although being knocked out in the first round of singles, Björkman and Kevin Ullyett made it to the final, being defeated by second seeds Daniel Nestor and Nenad Zimonjić, though receiving a hero's farewell to his extensive career at Wimbledon.

Björkman retired from professional tennis, after the Swede and his partner Ullyett failed to qualify for the doubles semifinal at the 2008 Tennis Masters Cup.

On 2 October 2013, he announced a comeback on tour in If Stockholm Open doubles draw, receiving a wild card in pair with fellow countryman Robert Lindstedt.

He competed as a celebrity dancer in Let's Dance 2015.

Coaching

Andy Murray added Björkman to his coaching staff in March 2015, initially on a five-week trial to help out in periods when Amélie Mauresmo was unavailable as she only agreed to travel with him for 25 weeks of the tennis year when she first became Murray's coach in June 2014. However, at the end of the 2015 Australian Open, Mauresmo had informed Murray that she was pregnant and expecting in August. Murray then announced in late April 2015 that Björkman would be his main coach for all of the North American hard-court swing, while Mauresmo would be on maternity leave after 2015 Wimbledon until late in the year. Jonas Björkman joined Murray's team in April 2015, helping Murray win the BMW Open in Munich; his first clay-court title. This was followed by Murray winning his first Masters 1000 title on clay in Madrid. In June 2015, Björkman was with Andy Murray through Queen's where Murray ended up winning his fourth Queen's Club title at the Aegon Championships. and Björkman was Murray's main coach when Murray won the 2015 Canadian Open in Montreal, which was Murray's third Canadian Open title. In the middle of December 2015, Murray decided not to renew Bjorkman's contract. The Swede, who joined the world No. 2's entourage earlier in 2015, took charge of his coaching for the last four months of the season in the absence of Amélie Mauresmo but was not part of the team afterwards.

Major finals

Grand Slam finals

Doubles: 15 (9–6)

Mixed doubles: 2 (2 runner-ups)

Masters Series finals

Singles: 1 (1 runner-up)

Career finals

Singles: 11 (6–5)

Doubles: 97 (54–43)

Performance timelines

Singles

Doubles

Top 10 wins

References

External links
 jonasbjorkman.com – official website
 
 
 
 Bjorkman World Ranking history

Swedish expatriates in Monaco
Swedish male tennis players
Olympic tennis players of Sweden
Swedish tennis coaches
Australian Open (tennis) champions
French Open champions
Hopman Cup competitors
Wimbledon champions
US Open (tennis) champions
Tennis players at the 1996 Summer Olympics
Tennis players at the 2004 Summer Olympics
Tennis players at the 2008 Summer Olympics
1972 births
Living people
People from Alvesta Municipality
Grand Slam (tennis) champions in men's doubles
ATP number 1 ranked doubles tennis players
ITF World Champions
Sportspeople from Kronoberg County
Padel coaches